Malin Sophie Díaz Pettersson (born 3 January 1994) is a Swedish football midfielder who plays for Djurgårdens IF. She previously played at club level for AIK, Tyresö FF, and Eskilstuna United DFF of the Damallsvenskan. Diaz has represented the Sweden women's national football team at senior level.

Early life
Malin was born to Swedish man Thomas Pettersson and Claudia Díaz, who had moved to Sweden from Chile aged eight after the 1973 coup d'état in her home country.

Club career
Diaz made her debut for AIK in the Damallsvenskan as a 15-year-old against Sunnanå SK in October 2009. She started her first match a week later against Kopparbergs/Göteborg FC, in which she also scored her first goal for the club. She finished the 2009 season having played two matches, with one start and one goal. After returning to AIK for the 2010 Damallsvenskan season, she made 16 starts in 19 appearances for a total of 1,488 minutes played. She scored two goals: one during a match against Kristianstad on 3 July in which AIK won 3–1 and another during a 2–2 draw against Umeå on 19 September.

Following AIK's relegation, Diaz made 17 Norrettan appearances during the 2011 season, where she scored two goals and made five assists, as the club won promotion back to the Damallsvenskan. Diaz signed a new two-year contract with AIK ahead of the 2012 season. She made 21 appearances with 19 starts for a total of 1,656 minutes on the pitch for AIK during the 2012 season.

In January 2013, with AIK relegated again after a 3–4–15 season ended with them bottom of the league table, Diaz signed for league champions Tyresö. She reasoned that, although it would be difficult to break into the team, training alongside Tyresö's star names would improve her as a player. She made her debut for Tyresö during a match against Sunnanå SK on 19 May 2013, which her new team won 10–2.

Diaz was frustrated with her backup role and came close to quitting Tyresö, before she began to play more regularly in 2014. She started Tyresö's 4–3 defeat by Wolfsburg in the 2014 UEFA Women's Champions League Final. Tyresö had suffered a financial collapse in 2014 and withdrew from the league, expunging all their results and making all their players free agents. In June 2014 Umeå IK announced that they were in negotiations to sign Diaz.

Instead Diaz signed for ambitious Damallsvenskan newcomers Eskilstuna United DFF during the summer break. "Eskilstuna is a team on the up and I have the same feeling, to continue to grow," she said.

International career

As a Swedish under-19 international, Diaz featured at the 2012 U-19 European Championship. She scored the victorious Swedish team's extra time goal in the 1–0 final win over Spain. Reporters covering the tournament for UEFA praised Diaz's technique and passing, naming her among ten "emerging talents".

In December 2012, national team coach Pia Sundhage called up Diaz to a senior squad training camp at Bosön. Diaz was also capped for Sweden at under-23 level.

Diaz was called into the senior Sweden squad for the 2015 FIFA Women's World Cup qualifying match against Northern Ireland in April 2014, after injured Caroline Seger withdrew. She appeared as an injury time substitute in Portadown, to win her first senior cap. Diaz started her first match for the Blågult in June 2014, a 5–0 win over the Faroe Islands.

In May 2015, Diaz and Eskilstuna team-mates Olivia Schough and Sara Thunebro were named in Sundhage's Sweden squad for the 2015 FIFA Women's World Cup in Canada.

International goals

Honours

International
 Sweden
 UEFA Women's Under-19 Championship (1): 2012

References

External links

 
 
 Malin Diaz at SvFF 
 
 Tyresö FF player profile 
 

Swedish women's footballers
1994 births
Living people
Swedish people of Chilean descent
Tyresö FF players
Eskilstuna United DFF players
Damallsvenskan players
Women's association football midfielders
AIK Fotboll (women) players
Sweden women's international footballers
2015 FIFA Women's World Cup players
Djurgårdens IF Fotboll (women) players